The Robber Bridegroom may refer to:
 The Robber Bridegroom (fairy tale), a German fairy tale collected by the Brothers Grimm
 The Robber Bridegroom (novella),  1942 novella by Eudora Welty, inspired by and loosely based on the Grimm fairy tale
 The Robber Bridegroom (musical), a 1975 Broadway musical, based on the 1942 novella